Shino Lin (born 9 December 1973) is a Taiwanese singer and actress.

Discography
 1998 Sìyě línxiǎopéi 
 1999 Tā zhīdào 
 1999 Qínggē wèi nǐ (EP) 
 2000 Zhè shì sìyě 
 2001 Yǒu nǐ de kuàilè EP 
 2001 Sìyě gōng 
 2003 Bùzhī hǎodǎi 
 2003 SHINO 1 rì zuì jiā shǒu zhāngjīngxuǎn 
 2008 Dì yī zhāng 
 2010 Wǔ yǔ lúnbǐ 
 2013 Wǒ wàngle

Filmography
 2008: Cape No. 7
 2017: 52Hz, I Love You

References

Living people
Women rock singers
1973 births
Taiwanese film actresses
21st-century Taiwanese actresses
Taiwanese television actresses
Taiwanese people of Hakka descent
People from Pingtung County
21st-century Taiwanese singers
21st-century Taiwanese women singers